Beroe or Beroë may refer to :

Places and jurisdictions 
 a city and former archbishopric of Ancient Thrace, now Stara Zagora in Bulgaria and a Latin Catholic titular see, which was founded under the name Beroe (meaning iron) and renamed to Augusta Trajana
 Battle of Beroe, fought at Beroe in 250 between the Romans and the Goths
 Battle of Beroia, fought at Beroe in 1122 between the Pechenegs and the Byzantine Empire
 PFC Beroe Stara Zagora, commonly known as PFC Beroe, a football club from Stara Zagora
 Beroe Stadium, PFC Beroe's multi-use stadium
 BC Beroe, a basketball club from Stara Zagora
 Beroea, also called Berea, an ancient (Biblical) city in Greece, now known as Veria
 Beroeans, the inhabitants of that city, also called Bereans
 a Roman fortified frontier post at the lower Danube, now Ostrov, Tulcea, Tulcea County, Romania

Other uses 
 Beroe (ctenophore), a genus of the Nuda class of comb jellies (ctenophore phylum)
 In Greek mythology:
Beroe (Greek myth)

 Beroe Hill, a hill in Livingston Island, West Antarctica

See also 
 Beroea (disambiguation)